Blades Hill is a village in Saint Philip Parish in Barbados.

References 

Populated places in Barbados